Balaji Temple of Ketkawle, is copy of the real Tirumala Venkateswara Temple located 60 km from Pune, Maharashtra. It is on Pune-Bangalore highway.

History 

 This temple is a replica of the original Tirupati Temple located in Tirumala.
 Everything is perfect copy of the idol, Sanctorum, wood work, priests are abode of the Lord Venkateswara at Tirumala.
 The Venkateshwara charitable trust built the temple from 1996 to 2003.
 Created by the V H Group spending 27 Crore Rs.

References

Hindu temples in Maharashtra